Princeton is a city in Franklin County, Kansas, United States.  As of the 2020 census, the population of the city was 248.

History
Princeton had its start about 1869 by the building of the railroad through that territory. It was named after the city of Princeton, Illinois.

The railroad no longer runs through Princeton, and the former tracks have been converted into the Prairie Spirit rail trail.

Geography
Princeton is located at  (38.488387, -95.270357).

Demographics

2010 census
As of the census of 2010, there were 277 people, 109 households, and 78 families residing in the city. The racial makeup of the city was 95.3% White, 1.1% Native American, and 3.6% from two or more races. Hispanic or Latino of any race were 4.3% of the population.

There were 109 households, of which 37.6% had children under the age of 18 living with them, 53.2% were married couples living together, 14.7% had a female householder with no husband present, 3.7% had a male householder with no wife present, and 28.4% were non-families. 22.0% of all households were made up of individuals, and 6.4% had someone living alone who was 65 years of age or older. The average household size was 2.54 and the average family size was 2.97.

The median age in the city was 33.5 years. 27.4% of residents were under the age of 18; 9.1% were between the ages of 18 and 24; 25.6% were from 25 to 44; 26.7% were from 45 to 64; and 11.2% were 65 years of age or older. The gender makeup of the city was 45.8% male and 54.2% female.

2000 census
As of the census of 2000, there were 317 people, 111 households, and 88 families residing in the city. The racial makeup of the city was 95.90% White, 0.63% African American, 0.63% Asian, and 2.84% from two or more races. 0.63% of the population were Hispanic or Latino of any race.

There were 111 households, out of which 45.0% had children under the age of 18 living with them, 65.8% were married couples living together, 9.9% had a female householder with no husband present, and 20.7% were non-families. 18.9% of all households were made up of individuals, and 9.0% had someone living alone who was 65 years of age or older. The average household size was 2.86 and the average family size was 3.19.

In the city, the population was spread out, with 33.4% under the age of 18, 9.5% from 18 to 24, 29.3% from 25 to 44, 18.3% from 45 to 64, and 9.5% who were 65 years of age or older. The median age was 32 years. For every 100 females, there were 109.9 males. For every 100 females age 18 and over, there were 95.4 males.

The median income for a household in the city was $33,333, and the median income for a family was $36,042. Males had a median income of $26,607 versus $20,139 for females. The per capita income for the city was $11,698. 8.5% of the population and 4.9% of families were below the poverty line. Out of the total population, 5.2% of those under the age of 18 and 23.1% of those 65 and older were living below the poverty line.

Education
Princeton is a part of Central Heights USD 288 school district, headquarters located in Richmond. School mascot is Central Heights Vikings.

Princeton schools were closed through school unification in 1965. The Princeton High School mascot was Princeton Orioles.

References

Further reading

External links
 Princeton - Directory of Public Officials
 USD 288, local school district
 Princeton city map, KDOT

Cities in Kansas
Cities in Franklin County, Kansas